Periclista is a genus of common sawflies in the family Tenthredinidae. There are at least 20 described species in Periclista.

Species
These 23 species belong to the genus Periclista:

 Periclista albicollis Norton, 1872 b
 Periclista albida (Klug, 1816) g
 Periclista albipennis (Zaddach, 1859) g
 Periclista albiventris (Klug, 1816) g
 Periclista analis Konow, 1886 g
 Periclista andrei Konow, 1906 g
 Periclista coiffaiti Chevin, 1980 g
 Periclista cretica (W.Schedl, 1981) g
 Periclista diluta Cresson, 1880 b
 Periclista dusmeti Konow, 1907 g
 Periclista freidbergi D.R.Smith, 1982 g
 Periclista hermonensis D.R.Smith, 1982 g
 Periclista lenta Konow, 1903 g
 Periclista lineolata (Klug, 1816) g
 Periclista major (Neocharactus) major Smith, 2012 b
 Periclista media Norton, 1864 b
 Periclista osellai F.Pesarini & Turrisi, 2003 g
 Periclista pilosa Chevin, 1971 g
 Periclista pubescens (Zaddach, 1859) g
 Periclista rufiventris Zombori, 1979 g
 Periclista sicelis F.Pesarini & Turrisi, 2003 g
 Periclista vernalis Lacourt, 1985 g
 Periclista wittmeri Zombori, 1979 g

Data sources: i = ITIS, c = Catalogue of Life, g = GBIF, b = Bugguide.net

References

Further reading

External links

 

Tenthredinidae